The men's shot put event at the 2000 World Junior Championships in Athletics was held in Santiago, Chile, at Estadio Nacional Julio Martínez Prádanos on 19 October.  A 7257g (Senior implement) shot was used.

Medalists

Results

Final
19 October

Qualifications
19 October

Group A

Group B

Participation
According to an unofficial count, 37 athletes from 28 countries participated in the event.

References

Shot put
Shot put at the World Athletics U20 Championships